When Aurangzeb made Aurangabad his capital, there were 54 suburbs which were walled in like the city itself, but the chief of these that were populated in the 19th century were Begampura and Aurang-pura.

Old suburbs
The names of the suburbs are/were
*Begampura
Aurangpura
Mukampura
Fazalpura
Ahirpura
Dawadpura
Nawabpura
Bajipura
Darveshpura
Nakashpura
Kutubpura
Jasuspura
Sultanpura
Karanpura
Chelipura
Subkaranpura
Ismailpura
Tanjipura
Padampura
Lasgopalpura
Manjurpura
Haisingpura
Partabpura
Pahadsingpura
Jamalpura
Mansingpura
Jaisingpura
Jaswantsingpura
Bhausingpura
Jaychandpura
Ranmastpura
Paidapura
Hamilpura
Dhori-pura
Kalhalpura
Paraspura
Tabibpura
Ramraspura
Chakarpura
Kotwalpura
Lalwantpura
Asadpura
Rampura
Rengtipnra
Kesarsingpura
Balochpura
Rambapura
Khokarpura
Maujipura
Jasudpura

Out of the above, Pahadsingpura, Kutubpura, Jaisingpura, Balochpura, Karnapura, Padampura, and Jaswant-singpura were founded by the rajas who accompanied Aurangzib; Subkaranpura and Pahadsingpura belonged to the raja of Bandalkand; Pudampura and Karanpura belonged to the raja of Bikanir, and Jaisingpura to the raja of Jaipur. A large market for vegetables is held daily at Maujipura which is now almost in ruins, while Bhausingpura is under cultivation.

Old bazaars
There were 38 bazaars, named after the principal articles sold in them, and held in the streets leading to the several gateways. The chief bazaars were Rang Mahal, Azamnagar, Dalai Bari, Taksal, Ram Ganj, Fakirwari, Shah Ganj, Khadim Bazaar, Chauk Baldar, Shah Bazaar, Urdu Bazaar, Raja Rambaksh Bazaar, Guru Ganj, Zuna Bazaar, Gul Mandi, Dal Mandi, Shakar Mandi, and Chawal Mandi.

New neighborhoods of Aurangabad City

* Aarif Colony
 Aasifiya Colony
 Aurangpura
 Altamash Colony
 Angoori Bagh
 Bada Takiya
 Baiji Pura
 Balaji Nagar
 Bajrang Chowk
 Bajaj Nagar & Waluj
 Bahrat Nagar
 Bansilal Nagar
 Begum Pura
 Bhadkal Gate
 Buddi Lane
 Bukkal Guda
 CIDCO(N-1 to N-15)
 Central Naka
 Cheli Pura
 Chetana Nagar
 Chota Takiya
 City Chowk
 Champa Chowk
 Chawani
 Delhi Gate
 Dr. Rafiq Zakaria Road
 Devanagari Shahnoorwadi
 Dashmeshnagar
 Divandevdi
 Gandhinagar
 Ganesh Colony
 Garkheda
 Gulmandi
 Gulmohar Colony CIDCO N-5
 Harsul
 Hazrat Nizamuddin Road
 Heena Nagar
 Hilaal Colony
 Himayat Baugh
 HUDCO (H-1 to H-20)
 Indira Nagar, Garkheda
 Itkheda
 Jaffer Gate
 Jai Vishwabharti Colony
 Jaisinghpura
 Jalan Nagar
 Jaynagar
 Jalna Road
 Jawahar Colony
 Jinsi
 Juna Bazar
 Jubilee Park
 Jyotinagar
 Kabaadipura
 Kanchanwadi
 Kareem Colony
 Karnapura
 KatKat Gate
 Khadkeshwar
 Khara Kuwa
 Khokadpura
 Kiradpura
 Kotla Colony
 Kranti Chowk
 Kuwarfalli
 Lota Karanja
 Mahmoodpura
 Manzoorpura/Mominpura
 Mayurban Colony
 Maqsood Colony
 Mondha
 Motiwala Nagar
 Moti Karanja
 Mujeeb Colony
 Mukundwadi
 Nava Bhaata (Osmanpura)
 Nageshwarwadi
 NakshatraWadi
 Nandanvan Colony
 Narali Bag
 National Colony
 Nawabpura
 New Shreynager
 New Osmanpura
 Nirala Bazaar
 Nishaan
 Noor Colony
 Osmanpura
 Peer Bazar
 Padampura
 Padegaon
 Pandariba
 Paithan Gate
 Paithan Road
 Paithan Road Near Nathvally School
 Paithan Road Near Nath Seeds
 Pandharpur & Chitegaon MIDC
 Panalal Nagar
 Qiasar Colony
 Raja Bazar
 Rasheedpura
 Rauf Colony
 Rauza Bag
 Ravivar Bazar
 Renukamata Mandir
 Roshan Gate
 Samtanagar
 Shah Colony Osmanpura
 Saadat Nagar
 Sabzi Mandi Paithan Gate
 Samarth Nagar
 Satara Parisar
 Sawarkar Nagar
 Seven Hills
 Shah Bazar
 Shah Ganj
 Shahnoorwadi
 Raj Nagar (Shahnoorwadi)
 Shantinath Housing Society
 Shantiniketan Colony
 Shah Noor Miyan Darghah
 Shendra MIDC
 Shivaji Nagar
 Sutgirni Road Stadium
 Shivsamadhan Colony
 Shivshankar Colony
 Silk Mills
 Silli Khana
 Town Hall
 Tilaknagar
 Rauf Colony
 TV Center.
 Ulkanagari
 Vasundhara Colony
 Vaishali Nagar
 Vishram Baugh Colony
 Visvabharti Colony
 Vyankatesh Colony
 Yashodhara Colony
 Yunus Colony
 Zambad Estate

References

Gazetter of Aurangabad - H. H. The Nizam's Government 1884. (Chapter XI page 805 - 877)

Aurangabad, Maharashtra
Neighbourhoods in Maharashtra